The 1960 Ladies Open Championships was held at the Lansdowne Club in London from 15–21 February 1960. Sheila Macintosh (née Speight) finally won the title after losing in four consecutive finals to the retired Janet Morgan. Macintosh defeated Fran Marshall in the final.

Seeds

Draw and results

First round

denotes seed (*)
Seeded players Miss M E Gowthorpe and Mrs J M Goodin both withdrew.

Second round

Third round

Quarter-finals

Semi-finals

Final

References

Women's British Open Squash Championships
British Open Squash Championships
Women's British Open Squash Championships
Squash competitions in London
Women's British Open Championships
British Open Championships
Women's British Open Squash Championships